The 2011 WNBA Playoffs was the postseason for the Women's National Basketball Association's 2011 season. Four teams from each of the league's two conferences qualified for the playoffs seeded 1 to 4 in a tournament bracket, with the two opening rounds in a best-of-three format, and the final in a best-of-five format. The finals were won by the Minnesota Lynx who defeated the defending Eastern Conference Champion Atlanta Dream.

The Minnesota Lynx was the top overall seed in the tournament, having finished 27-7 in the regular season, the best record in franchise history. The team was appearing in its first playoffs since 2004. Prior to the 2011 playoffs, the Lynx had not won a playoff series in franchise history. This changed in the 2011 playoffs, as the Lynx won their first two playoff series to advance to the WNBA Finals.

The Atlanta Dream had reached the 2010 WNBA Finals, losing in three games to the Seattle Storm. Despite a slow start to the 2011 season, the Dream rebounded to finish with a 20-14 record, good for the third seed in the Eastern Conference. The Dream upset two higher-seeded teams to reach the WNBA finals for the second straight year.

After earning the third seed in the West, the Phoenix Mercury reached their third straight conference finals after upsetting the defending WNBA Champion Seattle Storm in the opening round. They ultimately lost to Minnesota in the conference final.

The Indiana Fever was the top seed in the Eastern Conference, and dispatched the New York Liberty in the opening round. They ultimately fell short to Atlanta in the conference final after WNBA MVP Tamika Catchings tore her plantar fascia in game two of the series, limiting her in the decisive game.

The Seattle Storm earned the West's second seed, and were attempting to repeat as WNBA champions. They took a 1-0 lead in the conference semifinals, but then dropped the next two, losing to Phoenix.

The Connecticut Sun earned the second seed in the East, but were swept in the opening round by the Dream, the eventual East champs.

The San Antonio Silver Stars were the lowest overall seed in the West and the tournament, and drew the unenviable task of playing the Minnesota Lynx. Despite the apparent mismatch, the Silver Stars lost by only one point in game one of the opening round, and won game two. They could not keep up with the Lynx in game three, however, and lost in the opening round.

Format
The top 4 teams from each conference qualify for the playoffs.
All 4 teams are seeded by basis of their standings.
The series for rounds one and two are in a best-of-three format with Games 1 and 3 on the home court of the team with the higher seed. In previous years, the higher seed would play the first game on the road, then games 2 and (if needed) 3 at home.
The series for the WNBA Finals is in a best-of-five format with Games 1, 2 and 5 on the home court of the team with the higher seed.

Tiebreak procedures

Two-team tie
 Better record in head-to-head games.
 Better winning percentage within own conference.
 Better winning percentage against all teams with .500 or better record at the end of the season.
 Better point differential in games head-to-head.
 Coin toss.

Three or more-team tie
 Better winning percentage among all head-to-head games involving tied teams.
 Better winning percentage against teams within conference (for first two rounds of playoffs) or better record against teams in the opposite conference (for Finals).
 Better winning percentage against all teams with a .500 or better record at the end of the season.
 Better point differential in games involving tied teams.
 Coin toss.

Playoff qualifying

Eastern Conference

Western Conference

Bracket
Note: italics denote home-court advantage; bold denotes series winner.

Eastern Conference

Conference semifinals

(2) Connecticut Sun vs. (3) Atlanta Dream

Regular-season series
The teams were tied 2–2 in the regular-season series:

(1) Indiana Fever vs. (4) New York Liberty

Regular-season series
The teams were tied 2–2 in the regular-season series:

Conference finals

(1) Indiana Fever vs. (3) Atlanta Dream

Regular-season series
The Atlanta Dream won 4–0 in the regular season series:

Western Conference

Conference semifinals

(1) Minnesota Lynx vs. (4) San Antonio Silver Stars

Regular-season series
The Minnesota Lynx won 4–0 in the regular season series:

(2) Seattle Storm vs. (3) Phoenix Mercury

Regular-season series
The Seattle Storm won 3–1 in the regular-season series:

Conference finals

(1) Minnesota Lynx vs. (3) Phoenix Mercury

Regular-season series
The Minnesota Lynx won 3–2 in the regular season series:

WNBA Finals

Minnesota Lynx vs. Atlanta Dream

Regular-season series
The Minnesota Lynx won the season series 2-0:

References

External links
Official Site
2011 WNBA Playoffs at ESPN

Playoffs
Women's National Basketball Association Playoffs